The Austin Sheerline is a large luxury car produced by Austin in the United Kingdom from 1947 until 1954.

The Sheerline was designed by Austin during the Second World War, but volume production did not begin until 1947 because of the commitment to war production. It was a luxurious car in the style of the contemporary Rolls-Royce or Bentley but at a much lower price, around two-thirds that of the equivalent Rolls-Royce but still the price of five or six small Austins. There were about 8,000 built.

The new Sheerline, with razor-edge styling, first appeared at the Geneva Motor Show on 13 March 1947.

Initially only a Saloon version on a 9-foot-11¼-inch (3 metres) wheelbase chassis was made, but this was joined by a Limousine version in late 1949 on a stretched 11 ft (3.3 metres) chassis also used for a hearse and an ambulance. At 37 hundredweight (1,850 kg) for the saloon and 2 tons (2,000 kg) for the limousine this was a heavy car, and to maintain performance a low final drive ratio of 4.55:1 with 16-inch tyres was fitted.

A pressed-steel cross-braced chassis frame was used, and for the first time on an Austin, independent front suspension. Other features were a hydraulic jacking system, Lockheed hydraulic brakes and a steering-column gearshift. Suspension was by coil springs at the front and semi-elliptic leaf springs at the rear.

Anders Clausager, an archivist at BL Heritage Ltd, discovered that no more than 12 Sheerlines and 32 Princesses, mainly prototype and pre-production cars, were fitted with the 3,460cc engine before the increase to 3,993cc at the end of 1947.

Production ceased in 1954 and Austin's luxury offering was limited to the A135 Austin Princess.

The consensus is that in the Last Of The Summer Wine episode The Loxley Lozenge, the chassis of an Austin Sheerline was used as a prop for the titular fictional vehicle.

References

Further reading

External links

Austin Memories

Sheerline
Cars introduced in 1947
Limousines